2-Acetylbutyrolactone (ABL) is a derivative of γ-butyrolactone that is used as a precursor in organic synthesis, and it is used to identify primary amines through chemical fluorescence.

Preparation 
2-Acetylbutyrolactone can be prepared by a condensation reaction between an ester of acetic acid (such as ethyl acetate) with butyrolactone in an alkaline solution.

2-Acetylbutyrolactone can also be prepared by reacting ethylene oxide with ethyl acetoacetate in alkaline conditions.

Uses

Spectrofluorimetry 

2-Acetylbutyrolactone itself is only slightly fluorescent, but its derivatives show high UV fluorescence. The carbonyl group readily reacts with amines to form Schiff bases. It is for this reason that 2-acetylbutyrolactone is frequently used to confirm the creation of amines during organic synthesis. 2-Acetylbutyrolactone can also undergo a Japp‐Klingemann reaction to form fluorescent molecules with arylamines.

Drug precursor 
2-Acetylbutyrolactone is used as a precursor to numerous drugs including santalene and α-methylene-γ-butyrolactones.

References 

Tetrahydrofurans